Urothrips is a genus of thrips in the family Phlaeothripidae.

Species
 Urothrips bagnalli
 Urothrips calvus
 Urothrips gibberosa
 Urothrips junctus
 Urothrips kobroi
 Urothrips lancangensis
 Urothrips minor
 Urothrips paradoxus
 Urothrips reedi
 Urothrips reticulatus
 Urothrips tarai

References

Phlaeothripidae
Thrips
Thrips genera